HMS Euphrates was an iron-hulled troopship of the Euphrates class.  She was designed for the transport of British troops to India, and launched in the River Mersey on 24 November 1866 by Laird Brothers of Birkenhead. She was the fourth and last Royal Navy ship to bear the name.

Design
Euphrates was one of five iron-hulled vessels of the Euphrates class. All five were built to a design of 360 ft overall length by about 49 ft breadth, although Malabar was very slightly smaller than the rest of the class. They had  a single screw, a speed of 14 knots, one funnel, a barque-rig sail plan, three 4-pounder guns, and a white painted hull. Her bow was a "ram bow" which projected forward below the waterline.

History

She was operated by the Royal Navy to transport up to 1,200 troops and family from Portsmouth to Bombay. The return trip via the Suez canal normally took 70 days.

On 28 February 1870, she was damaged in a collision with the British merchant ship Bates Family at Bombay, India. On 19 December 1883, she ran aground off Gibraltar. She was refloated the next day. On 6 February 1892, she collided with the German steamer Gutenfels in the Suez Canal. Gutenfels suffered several broken plates and some damage to her upperworks.

Fate
She was sold to I Cohen in Portsmouth on 23 November 1894 and resold to Henry Castle and Son for breaking in August 1895.

References

External links
 
 Personal description, Alnod Studd of 15th Hussars, 1876
 Diary of voyage, J S Waterhouse, Green Howards, 1870 
 Questions in the House of Commons, 1872 - HMS Euphrates

 

Troop ships of the Royal Navy
Euphrates-class troopships
Victorian-era naval ships of the United Kingdom
Ships built on the River Mersey
1866 ships
Maritime incidents in February 1870
Maritime incidents in December 1883
Maritime incidents in 1892